Juan Louw Schoeman (born 18 September 1991 in Pretoria, South Africa) is a South African rugby union player for the Bath in Premiership Rugby. His regular position is loosehead prop.

Career

Youth and Varsity Cup rugby

In 2008 and 2009, he was named in the Blue Bulls Under-18 Craven Week squads.

After the 2009 tournament, he was also named in a South Africa Schools High Performance squad that played against their Namibian counterparts, with Schoeman scoring one of thirteen tries in a 93–10 demolition.

He was included in the  squad for the Under-19 Provincial Championships in 2009 and 2010, scoring two tries in fourteen starts in 2010.

In 2011, he was selected in the South Africa Under-20 side that competed at the 2011 IRB Junior World Championship in Italy. He started their pool matches against Scotland and England, as well as their 5th-placed play-off match against Fiji, helping his side to a 104–17 victory.

Upon his return to domestic action, he played for the  side in the 2011 and 2012 Under-21 Provincial Championships, making 22 starts in total.

Blue Bulls

Schoeman made his first class debut for the  during the 2011 Currie Cup Premier Division, shortly after his return from the 2011 IRB Junior World Championship.

However, his next appearance only came during the 2014 Vodacom Cup competition, when he started seven of their matches.

Sharks

In 2015, he was named in the  squad prior to the 2015 Currie Cup Premier Division.

Bath
Schoeman signed for Premiership Rugby team Bath.

References

South African rugby union players
Living people
1991 births
Rugby union players from Pretoria
Rugby union props
Blue Bulls players
South Africa Under-20 international rugby union players
Sharks (Currie Cup) players
Sharks (rugby union) players
Southern Kings players
Bath Rugby players